Fizalam-William Perras (10 March 1876 – 28 June 1936) was a Liberal party member of the House of Commons of Canada. He was born in Hull, Quebec, the son of F. Marcelin Perras and Anatalie Sabourin, and became a lumber merchant.

Perras attended the University of Ottawa. For 15 years, Perras was mayor of Gracefield, Quebec and was a warden of Hull County.

He was first elected to Parliament at the Wright riding in the 1925 general election then re-elected in 1926, 1930 and 1935. Perras died in Ottawa on 28 June 1936 from a short illness before completing his term in the 18th Canadian Parliament.

References

External links
 

1876 births
1936 deaths
Liberal Party of Canada MPs
Mayors of places in Quebec
Members of the House of Commons of Canada from Quebec
Politicians from Gatineau
University of Ottawa alumni